Gilmore is an unincorporated community and census-designated place (CDP) in Allegany County, Maryland, United States. As of the 2010 census it had a population of 127. It is part of the Cumberland, MD-WV Metropolitan Statistical Area.

Gilmore lies in the valley of Georges Creek, a tributary of the North Branch Potomac River, between Dans Mountain to the southeast and Big Savage Mountain to the northwest. Maryland Route 36 runs north–south through the community.

Demographics

References 

Census-designated places in Allegany County, Maryland
Census-designated places in Maryland
Populated places in the Cumberland, MD-WV MSA
Cumberland, MD-WV MSA